Navigators USA is an American non-aligned Scouting organization that was founded in 2003 in New York City.

, Navigators USA has more than 100 chapters across the United States and further groups in Europe. Navigators is open to all genders between ages 4 and 18. Navigators is based on ideas of consensus and allows for multi-age interactions where children can mentor each other. It is open to all regardless of sexual orientation or religious belief.

The mission of the Navigators is:

History
In 2003, Navigators USA was founded by a group of volunteers serving children in need in East Harlem, New York. They wanted to offer a Scouting experience for boys and girls that was non-discriminatory and secular. They felt there was a need for an alternative organization that approached Scouting from a different perspective than the established organizations.

Robin Bossert started the Navigators after facing a moral dilemma. The Boy Scouts of America, besides not allowing girls or gay youth, also required that boys believe in a supreme being. Due to these exclusionary practices, Bossert created the alternative Scouting group that would become the Navigators USA.

In the fall of 2010 a 188-page Navigators guidebook was completed and the new group became public. Bossert credits the guidebook for an increase in current interest. Not only does the guidebook teach outdoor skills it also has all the information to start Navigators.

In 2011, incumbent Mayor of New York City Michael Bloomberg stated at a fund-raiser at Christie's that "by belonging to the Navigators, boys and girls get the guidance and adult-supervised adventure that only Scouting can offer—in an atmosphere free of any stigma about sexual orientation. And as a proud Eagle Scout who has publicly told the Boy Scouts to change their wrong-headed anti-gay policy, I say 'Amen' to that!"

The first Navigators Chapter in the United Kingdom started in January 2014 in Kingskerswell, Devon. With subsequent groups now also opened up in Cornwall, Devon, Hereford, Kent and Yorkshire and many more either as entire new groups or transferring over from mainstream Scouting Associations.

In 2017, Navigators USA won a $9,500 grant for the completion of their Badge Book.

Program

The organization has three program sections: Stargazers, for children ages 4–6; Junior Navigators, age 7–10; and Senior Navigators age 11–18.

Junior Navigators have three levels:
 Mira
 Vega
 Polaris

The Senior section has four levels:
 Shadow
 Tracker
 Pilot
 Navigator

The program's top award is the Summit Achievement Award.

References

External links
 Navigators USA Homepage
 Navigators UK Homepage
  Yorkshire Navigators UK Homepage
 Mother Jones: Gay-Friendly Scouting Organization Doubles Its Numbers in One Year

Organizations established in 2003
Non-aligned Scouting organizations in the United States
Youth organizations based in the United States
2003 establishments in New York City